Maurice Antiste (born 22 June 1953 in Martinique) is a French politician who was elected to the French Senate on 25 September 2011, representing the department of Martinique.

References

Martiniquais politicians
French Senators of the Fifth Republic
French people of Martiniquais descent
1953 births
Living people
Senators of Martinique